The Battle of Orbulaq was fought in 1643 between Jahangir sultan Khan and Huntaiji Erdeni Batur, resulting in the defeat of Erdeni Batur's army by the Jalantush Bahadur's Kazakhs, led by Jahangir Sultan (later Jahangir sultan Khan) with the assistance of the Uzbek Emir of Samarkand. The battle, fought during a series of Kazakh-Dzungar Wars, was one of the initial turning points in the liberation war of the Kazakhs against the Dzhungar invasion in the 17th century.

Background

In the seventeenth century Kazakhstan presented the picture of a politically fragmented country. No stable economic and political ties could be formed between the Kazakh zhuzs. The difficulties standing in the way of uniting the Kazakh lands into a stable centralized state may be attributed to the economic backwardness of the Kazakh khanate and the predominance of a natural economy, marked by the decline of the towns in southern Kazakhstan.

The Dzungars or Oirats were mongol tribal confederation inhabiting north-western and western regions of present-day Xinjiang. Dzungar Khanate was established on the upper Emil River south of the Tarbagatai Mountains in the first half of the 17th century. Starting from the middle of the 17th century, the strategic goal of the Dzungar was to increase their pastoral territories by invading and annexing the lands of neighboring khanates. An aggressive foreign policy towards Zhetysu and Central Asia aggravated Kazakhstan-Dzhungar relations and often led to military conflicts. The struggle with the Dzhungars was headed by the son of  - Jahangir sultan-Sultan (1629-1680). Starting from 1635, Jahangir sultan-Sultan conducted a series of major battles with Dzhungar troops with varying success. In one of the battles in 1635, Jahangir sultan sultan was defeated and captured. Jahangir sultan sultan was in a privileged position in the camp of Oirat huntaiji and, according to some sources, even married one of his daughters. After returning from captivity, Jahangir sultan sultan again led the fight against the Dzhungars.

The campaigns of the Dzungar troops exposed the perniciousness of Kazakh tribal feuds and intra-feudal strife in the face of the aggressive threat that grew from year to year. In addition, from a military standpoint, the Dzungar Khanate represented a serious danger to the Kazakh clans. Unlike some Asian peoples who mastered the “arrowed battle”, firearms with wicks and artillery appeared in service of the Dzungar army as early as the end of the 17th century. For the war with the Kazakhs, the Dzungars purchased weapons and cannons from Russian gunsmiths and even cast them with the help of Swede Johann Gustav Renat, a captured sergeant of Swedish artillery. The Dzungar had a large and highly organized army at that time, of as many as two hundred thousand cavalry.

In 1640, a notorious kurultai took place, where the Kazakh steppes and rich cities of the Bukhara Khanate were chosen as the next target of the Dzungarian campaigns. In the winter of 1643, after short preparation, the expeditionary corps of the Dzungars, headed by the new huntaiji Erdeni-Batur, his relative Orchirtu and his brother-in-law , moved to the Kazakh steppes.

Feuding increased in the first quarter of the seventeenth century, when Ishim (Esim) Khan (1598–1628) succeeded his brother Tevke. Some of the more powerful Kazakh sultans became virtually independent of the khan. Prominent among them was Tursun Muhammad, who, installed by Imam Quli, the Uzbek ruler of Bukhara, proclaimed himself khan at Tashkent (1614–27) while Ishim ruled in Turkestan. After Ishim Khan, the situation of the Kazakh khanate deteriorated even further; the Dzungars seized part of Semirechye, subjugating the Kazakh nomads in the area. Ishim's son Jahangir sultan (1630–80) won a great victory against the Dzungars in the early 1640s but ultimately lost his life in a battle with the Dzungar ruler Galdan (1671–97).

Course of the battle
Over the initial stage of invasion into the Ili valley, the Kazakh Khanate began to retreat due to insufficient army size of only several hundred men[2] This relatively small troops were led by lieutenants Salim Karasai Batyr and Nasiruddin Argyntai Batyr, with Jahangir sultan sultan khan as supreme commander. Zhalantos Batyr, a commander of Bukhara forces, was expected to link up within a matter of several days.

The Dzungar army, in contrast, was much larger, having stood at an estimated fifty thousand men, led by newly appointed Erdeni Batur[3]

Jahangir sultan sultan chose a mountainous place near the Orbulaq river in the southwestern foot slopes of the Dzungarian Alatau as a place of the battle, resulting in the combat being named after it. The Kazakhs began entrenching - a tactic that became increasingly essential for the outnumbered defenders. The researchers, having carefully studied the place of the famous battle, note that Jahangir sultan sultan used a number of traditional warfare techniques from the Kazakh military art arsenal, but at the same time he applied a method of fragmentation of enemy forces - a strategy which was little in use among nomads. According to the description of A. I. Levshin, Jahangir sultan sultan, fearing an open military clash having a limited force of only about 600 soldiers, positioned part of his troops in a gorge between two mountains, having previously dug it with a deep moat and surrounded it with a high rampart. The length of fortifications was 2.5–3km, the front edge of the trench was as tall as a man. Half of the warriors organized field fortifications along the road, and the rest dispersed on the cliffs, thereby preparing an ambush for the Dzungars. In these fortifications, Jahangir sultan sultan patiently waited in the ambush, planning merely to drive off rather than destroy Erdeni-Batur led Dzungarian army.

This was the first time the Kazakh army had come prepared primarily with firearms rather than with swords or bow-and-arrow equipment. Many of the firearms the Kazakhs used were imported from Persia and were very modern for their time. This modern weaponry became a significant reason as to why the Kazakhs held off the Dzungars despite being heavily outnumbered.

The battle began with an element of surprise - having stumbled upon an ambush of the Kazakhs, the Dzungars immediately initiated attacks on entrenchment. Standing downhill in an open ground, the troops started to suffer heavy losses within a matter of minutes. In this battle, the Kazakhs used firearms en masse for the first time, and during the first hours the Dzungars lost so many soldiers that they were forced to retreat back to the open plain. According to various estimates, the Dzungars lost from one to some several thousand people in an ambush.

Around this time, the 20,000 reinforcement troops of the Emirate of Bukhara arrived to the aid of the Kazakhs. Zhalantos Batyr led Bukhara forces, despite significant distance to cover, managed to march right into the battle, entering the valley and hitting the rear of the Dzungars. The Dzungars, not expecting such a turn of events, went in dismay. Erdeni-Batur wisely decided not to engage further on and was forced to retreat to Dzungaria.

Location of the battlefield

The battle is known mainly from the notes of G.Ilyin and K. Kucheyev - Russian envoys to the Dzhungar huntaiji. In February 1643, Tobolsk servicemen, G. Ilyin and Kochimberdy Kucheyev, were sent from Tobolsk to Dzhungar Huntaiji Erdeni Batur in the southern Tarbagatai.

Since he had already gone to the raid on Zhetysu, the envoys waited for the Huntaiji to return for more than four months. From this campaign, he returned at the end of June, driving about 10,000 captured Kyrgyz. It is from these captives that they got all the  details of the battle. Their report to Tobolsk governor says that five tumen strong (50 000), the Erdeni Batur-led-expedition forces, which set out to Kazakh Zhetysu, suffered major defeat by the allied forces of Kazakhs and Bukhara Khanate. Thus, the fact of the battle itself is documented. Unfortunately, Ilyin and Kucheev did not indicate the place of the battle.

Kazakh historian Ville Galiev in his book "Han Jahangir sultan sultan i Orbulakskaya bitva" (Jahangir sultan sultan khan and Orbulaq battle), having studied the terrain and existing historical evidence, indicated the location of the battle as the Belzhailyau gorge in river Orbulaq valley in Dzhungar Alatau.

The Belzhailyau gorge situated in the valley of Orbulaq river is narrow and long. There is a high hill in the middle of it, located across the gorge, which resembles a bulk dam. From the east (Iliy valley) it has a gentle slope, and from the west (Balkhash) it is steep. This is the perfect place for an ambush. If you dig trenches along the top of the hill and put shooters there, the entire western part of the slope and the depression in front of the hill are clearly visible and are perfectly shot through.

But many historians doubt that such a major battle could have happened in the Dzungarian Alatau. According to most historians, by the middle of the seventeenth century the territory of Zhetysu was already in the hands of Dzungaria. The penetration of a small detachment of Jahangir sultan sultan's warriors deep into enemy territory is theoretically possible, but another 20,000 soldiers of Yalantush (Zhalantos) questions the possibility of battlefield in Belzhailyau. It is highly questionable the huge army of the Emir of Samarkand could cover the roughly 900 kilometers from the border of the Bukhara Khanate to Belzhailyau. The mystery of the battle between the Dzhungar's Erdeni Batur and the Kazakh's Jahangir sultan sultan-Sultan (who later became Khan) lies in the fact that no one knows where exactly it happened.

Controversy over the strength of Dzhungar army

Many historians have expressed doubts about the size of the Dzungarian army. During this time period, 50,000 soldiers required a considerable amount of human resources. Historians suggest that most probably a mistake was made when calculating and the numbers were greatly overestimated.

Even in the well-known and documented battles between the Chinese and the Dzhungars, the latter usually deployed no more than 30 thousand soldiers. For the Dzhungar, the Chinese front was the primary one and the most bloody battles took place there, and it was there that the life and death of Dzhungaria was decided. Chinese bogdykhans sought to destroy the Khanate, which constantly ravaged its western provinces. Eventually, in 1758, only Qianglong succeeded in doing so.

As to the strength of the Dzhungar army in Orbulaq, it can be assumed that the word “tumen” was misunderstood by the Russian envoys. If at the time of Genghis Khan this military unit numbered 10 thousand soldiers, by the time of Orbulaq "tumen" was simply an independent detachment with 2-3 thousand people at most. During the preparation of Zhetysu campaign, Batur-huntaiji invited his relatives to participate in the raid - his younger brother Chokur's son Ochirta and son-in-law Ablai Taisha, some Koyu-Sultan and Ombo, son of neighboring Altan Khan. Each of them, apparently, participated with personal tumen.

Most likely, the Russian envoys, believing that the tumen was 10 thousand, simply multiplied it by five. Moreover, they received this information from the prisoners driven from the raid. The Dzhungars themselves would never reveal the exact number of their troops, as that was considered strategic information.

Another moment is the interest of the warriors. The more soldiers involved in the campaign, the greater the number of shares. Due the lack of ample resource except herds in Kazakhs steppe, there could be a lack of incentive for warriors to fight over the region

Significance

The plans of the Dzhungar huntaiji to seize Zhetysu had been frustrated. Kazakhs regained control over the region. Kazakhs won time to prepare for the further advance of the Dzhungars into the region.

Jahangir sultan sultan-Sultan demonstrated the effectiveness of the new combat tactics of salvo firing from guns by foot soldiers. For Central Asia, it was a revolutionary experience in the use of firearms. 
Also for the first time in the military history of the Kazakh Khanate, trenches were used.

In tactical terms, the battle in Orbulaq demonstrated the ability of the Kazakh clans to join forces in the face of external threats. For the first time, representatives of three Kazakh zhuzes and their Uzbek allies successfully fought working in association.

Jahangir sultan sultan Khan proved to be a good commander and a strong strategist. Jahangir sultan sultan was awarded the honorary title "Salqam" (High). It is believed that Jahangir sultan sultan was well-informed about the armament and organization of the Dzhungarian army; in 1635 Jahangir sultan sultan-Sultan had been captured by the Kalmyk Taiji Hyundulen and held captive for several years. This knowledge, together with his leadership talent, helped the Kazakhs to eventually be victorious in the battle of Orbulaq.

Legacy
There is a granite stone on Belzhailyau hill placed in 1993 in honor of the 350th anniversary of the battle. The names Jahangir sultan Khan and of some soldiers who participated in the battle are written there. The heroic feat 375 yes ago, A museum of the Orbulaq battle was planned to be built, by 2019.
The battle was re-staged on the Taldykorgan hippodrome during the celebration of the 550th anniversary of the formation of the Kazakh Khanate.

References

Battles involving the Kazakh Khanate
Dzungar Khanate